The Istituto Europeo di Design (IED) is a private design school in Italy founded in 1966 by Francesco Morelli.

The school is organized into four disciplines: Design, Fashion, Visual Communication and Management.

It is spread over nine cities - Milan, Turin, Venice, Cagliari, Florence, Rome, Barcelona, Madrid and São Paulo - and thirteen locations which occupy more than 50,000 square meters of space. It offers 29 different courses of three-year duration, in several languages: English, Italian, Spanish and Portuguese. These courses are attended by about 10,000 students every year, totaling to more than 90,000 students, for the institute's forty-year history.

Facts and figures
The Istituto Europeo di Design, located in Italy, allows students to study for a Bachelor of Arts degree. Those who successfully complete the three-year course, obtain the 'Diploma Accademico di primo Livello' (i.e., Academic Diploma, First Level) which is legally recognized by the MIUR (Ministry of Education, University and Research) in the category of High Artistic Training (Ministerial Decree 10 December 2010 n. 292). 

In Spain, the institute offers the Bachelor of Arts with Honours, Masters and Postgraduates, Continuing Study Programs, Summer Courses and Executive Programs in Product Design, Fashion Design, Interior Design and Graphic Design.

Students who complete the four-year course obtain a Bachelor of Arts with Honours degree.

In Brazil, the IED offers the Diploma Universitário, which can be obtained after a three-year course in Fashion, Design and Visual Arts.

In China, the institute offers the Bachelor of Arts with Honours in Fashion, Visual Arts, Industrial Design and project management.

IED courses in Rome have a special focus in the areas of cinema, television and the new media.
Notable teachers include Lara Aragno, Viviana Gravano, Giulio Mazzarini, Emiliano Cappai, Michela Bonafoni, Bonizza Giordani and many others.

IED has two campuses in Milan, IED Moda and IED Design in two different locations.

IED Turin, operating since 1989, is located in a residential area in the city centre. More than 2500 square metres of schoolrooms and labs and an internal garden 500 square metres large host more than 800 students every year, both Italian and foreigners.

Notable people

Faculty

James Rivière, Italian jeweler
Giuseppe La Spada, Italian interdisciplinary artist

Alumni
Hélène Binet
Maria Grazia Chiuri, Italian fashion designer, creative director
Manuel Alberto Claro, cinematographer, filmmaker and still photographer
Natalie Korneitsik, public figure, fashion model
 Krishandi Hartanto, Indonesian entrepreneur

References 

Art schools in Italy
Film schools in Italy
Design schools in Italy